Anomis luridula is a moth species in the family Erebidae. It is found in North America.

The MONA or Hodges number for Anomis luridula is 8549.

Subspecies
These two subspecies belong to the species Anomis luridula:
 Anomis luridula luridula
 Anomis luridula professorum Schaus, 1923

References

Further reading

 
 
 

Scoliopteryginae
Articles created by Qbugbot
Moths described in 1852